Kiti Karaka Riwai (12 September 1870 – 21 January 1927) (also known as Kiti Karaka, Catherine Clark, Kate Clark, Kitty Clark, Kiti Karaka Te Ao Ahitana, or Kiti Ashton) was a New Zealand tribal leader. She was born in Ruapuke Island, Southland, New Zealand in 1870, to parents Arapetere Karaka (Albert Clark) and Mary (née Owen).

Of Māori and Moriori descent, she identified with the Kāti Māmoe iwi. Her first husband was Riwai Te Ropiha, a Moriori of the Chatham Islands, with whom she had nine children before divorcing in the early 1900s. Her second husband was Te Ao Ahitana Matenga (Joseph Ashton) of Ngāti Kahungunu, with whom she had one child, Joey Ashton.

She helped build the meeting house in Wairua in the 1890s. She died in Greytown in 1927.

References

1870 births
1927 deaths
Kāti Māmoe people
Moriori people
People from Ruapuke Island
19th-century New Zealand women
20th-century New Zealand women